Artem Yuriyovych Habelok (born 2 January 1995) is a Ukrainian football player who plays for Metalist 1925 Kharkiv.

Club career
He was raised in the youth teams of Shakhtar Donetsk, representing their Under-19 squad in the 2013–14 UEFA Youth League.

He made his senior professional-level debut in the Ukrainian Second League for Shakhtar-3 on 25 July 2014 in a game against Arsenal Bila Tserkva, as a starter.

In February 2017, he moved to Latvia, signing with Spartaks Jūrmala. He was a starter for most of the season as Spartaks won the 2017 Latvian Higher League.

On 3 July 2018, he returned to Ukraine, signing a two-year contract with Vorskla Poltava. He made his Ukrainian Premier League debut for Vorskla on 25 July 2018 in a game against Dynamo Kyiv as an 82nd-minute substitute for Dmytro Kravchenko. His first start came on 11 August against his first club, Shakhtar. That season Vorskla also qualified for the Europa League group stage, with Habelok making his full European debut on 4 October 2018 against Sporting CP, as a late substitute (he previously played in the Champions League qualifiers with Spartaks). Vorskla allowed two goals in added time and lost 1–2.

30 January 2021 Habelok left FC Pyunik by mutual consent.

International
He represented Ukraine U20 at the 2015 FIFA U-20 World Cup and made three substitute appearances in the tournament. He was the only one to score for Ukraine in the Round of 16 penalty shoot-out against Senegal as Ukraine was eliminated and three other penalty takers had their shots saved.

References

External links
 
 

1995 births
Footballers from Dnipro
Living people
Ukrainian footballers
Ukraine youth international footballers
Association football midfielders
FC Shakhtar-3 Donetsk players
FK Spartaks Jūrmala players
FC Vorskla Poltava players
FC Pyunik players
FC Metalist 1925 Kharkiv players
Armenian Premier League players
Latvian Higher League players
Ukrainian Premier League players
Ukrainian First League players
Ukrainian Second League players
Ukrainian expatriate footballers
Expatriate footballers in Latvia
Ukrainian expatriate sportspeople in Latvia
Expatriate footballers in Armenia
Ukrainian expatriate sportspeople in Armenia